Tuan Le (born February 15, 1978 in Paris, France) is a Vietnamese-American professional poker player.

Of Vietnamese ancestry, Le was raised in Kansas City, Missouri, in the United States, but by middle school age he was living in Los Angeles, California where he attended John Burroughs Junior High School, on McCadden and 6th Street. He later attended Cal State-Northridge as a finance major.

Le began playing in the $20/$40 limit hold'em games at the Hustler Casino in Los Angeles, where he currently resides.

As of 2015, Le's total live tournament winnings exceed $5,600,000.

World Poker Tour
In 2004, Le won his first World Poker Tour (WPT) event, earning over $1,500,000. In 2005, he finished first at the World Poker Tour Season 3 Championship, winning just over $2,800,000. He also won the WPT Battle of Champions III event, defeating Eli Elezra heads-up. With those wins, Tuan became the all-time leading money winner on the World Poker Tour, although he has since been overtaken in this ranking by Daniel Negreanu.

World Series of Poker bracelets 
In 2014 and 2015, Le won the $10,000 Limit 2-7 Triple Draw Lowball Championship for the second year in a row. His feat was the first time in WSOP history that a player has won consecutive $10,000 championships other than the main event.

Notes

1978 births
French poker players
Living people
World Poker Tour winners
World Series of Poker bracelet winners
Vietnamese poker players
Sportspeople from Kansas City, Missouri
People from Los Angeles